Riess Kelomat GmbH is a metalworking Austrian family business founded in 1550 and located in Ybbsitz, Amstetten District, Lower Austria.

Today the company, according to its own statement, is the only kitchen utensil manufacturer in Austria. 25% of production is exported and the number of employees was 120 in 2014.

See also 
List of oldest companies

References 
Article contains translated text from Riess Kelomat on the German Wikipedia retrieved on 17 March 2017.

External links 
Homepage

Metal companies of Austria
Companies established in the 16th century
16th-century establishments in the Holy Roman Empire
Economy of Lower Austria
Establishments in the Archduchy of Austria